Hurley W. Rudd Field at Gene Cox Stadium is a municipal American football venue for local teams in Tallahassee, FL. It seats approximately 5,500 fans, but can accommodate up to 1,000 additional people. It currently serves all nine public middle schools and five public high schools in Leon County. It is adjacent to the North Florida Fairgrounds.

History 

The stadium was built in 1969 when the addition of a third high school called for the construction of a shared central sports facility. A location bordering the North Florida Fairgrounds, on the south side of town, was selected.

Originally called Capital Stadium, its name was changed in 1998 to honor local high school coaching legend Gene Cox shortly after his retirement. The natural grass field was named in honor of four-term Florida state legislator and former Tallahassee, FL mayor Hurley W. Rudd Sr.

Football Use 

Today, Hurley W. Rudd Field at Gene Cox Stadium is home to all Leon County middle school football games and most home games for the local public high schools, including: Chiles High School, Godby High School, Leon High School, Lincoln High School, and Rickards High School. Due to the large demand for use of the stadium, all home game scheduling is channeled through Leon County Schools and often results in high school football games being played on Thursdays and Fridays. While it is not uncommon for games to also be played at Chiles High School and Leon High School, all intercity matchups take place at Gene Cox Stadium.

The stadium and field is officially a neutral site for all Tallahassee, FL public high schools, with the designated home and away teams in intercity games rotating on a year by year basis. However, the field has been occasionally painted by the county during the postseason to support specific area teams in the playoffs.

The FHSAA Girl's Flag Football finals will be held at the stadium in 2012, 2013, 2014. The top eight teams will play a two-day, three game tournament to crown the state champion. The first FHSAA final was at Clearwater High School in Pinellas County. The last eight championships have been played in Boca Raton.

Other Use 

In addition to serving Leon County public school football, Hurley W. Rudd Field at Gene Cox Stadium also hosts several other annual events, such as the regional high school marching band Marching Performance Assessment and the spring football combine. In 2006, it was the fall training site for the Tallahassee Titans, an American Indoor Football Association franchise, during the team's only season.

References 

High school football venues in the United States
Sports venues in Tallahassee, Florida
1969 establishments in Florida
Sports venues completed in 1969
American football venues in Florida
Soccer venues in Florida